The Astarte fritillary (Boloria astarte) is a butterfly of the family Nymphalidae. It is found from northwestern North America to northeastern Siberia. It is found as far south as Montana and Washington.

The wingspan is 42–51 mm. The butterfly flies from mid-June to mid-August.

The larvae feed on spotted saxifrage (Saxifraga bronchialis).

Subspecies
B. a. astarte (northern British Columbia)
B. a. distincta (Alaska, Yukon and Northwest Territories)

References

External links
Astarte Fritillary, Butterflies and Moths of North America

Boloria
Butterflies of North America
Butterflies of Asia
Butterflies described in 1847